Arbanitis lynabra is a species of armoured trap-door spider in the family Idiopidae, and is endemic to New South Wales. 

It was first described by Graham Wishart in 2006 as Misgolas lynabra, but was transferred to the genus, Arbanitis, by Michael Rix and others in 2017.

References

Idiopidae
Spiders described in 2006
Spiders of Australia
Fauna of New South Wales